São Mamede de Infesta e Senhora da Hora is a civil parish in the municipality of Matosinhos, Portugal. It was formed in 2013 by the merger of the former parishes São Mamede de Infesta and Senhora da Hora. The population in 2011 was 50,869, in an area of 8.78 km².

References

Freguesias of Matosinhos